Tha Carter IV is the ninth studio album by American rapper Lil Wayne, released on August 29, 2011, through Young Money Entertainment, Cash Money Records and Universal Republic Records. Recording sessions for the album began in late 2008, shortly after Lil Wayne's sixth studio album, Tha Carter III (2008) was released to strong sales and critical acclaim: however, the sessions were put on hold, as Lil Wayne claimed he did not want to follow an album he held in high regard so quickly with another, potentially inferior release. In the interim, Lil Wayne released his two other albums in 2010: the largely rock-themed Rebirth, and I Am Not a Human Being. The latter was reportedly composed from unreleased material from the original Tha Carter IV sessions, as the album was released whilst Wayne served a prison sentence at Rikers Island prison for illegal possession of a weapon, and was thus unable to record any new material: this also meant Tha Carter IV'''s recording sessions were once more put on hold.

Following Wayne's release from prison, the album was re-recorded from scratch. The recording sessions resumed at various locations, involving several record producers including Bangladesh, Detail, T-Minus, Noah "40" Shebib, Polow da Don, Jim Jonsin, Kane Beatz, Boi-1da, Willy Will, Streetrunner, Cool & Dre, Young Ladd, The Smeezingtons, and Kanye West. The album's largely concerns the themes of sex, violence, drugs and crime, but also love, hurt and emotional conflict. Appearances on the album include Cory Gunz, Drake, T-Pain, Tech N9ne, Andre 3000, Rick Ross, John Legend, Bruno Mars, Birdman, Kevin Rudolf, Jadakiss, Bun B, Nas, Shyne, and Busta Rhymes.

Following a heavily delayed release, Tha Carter IV was released to digital retailers at midnight on August 28, 2011, following Wayne's scheduled performance at the MTV Video Music Awards, and physical retailers received the album the following day. Tha Carter IV debuted at number one on the US Billboard 200 chart, with first-week-sales of 964,000 copies in the United States and became Lil Wayne's third album to debut at number one. The album received generally mixed reviews from music critics, who were divided in their responses towards the album's production and Wayne's own performances on the album, finding it to be a disappointment compared to his previous work.

Background and development
In June 2008, after a similarly delayed release, Lil Wayne released his previous album in the Tha Carter series, Tha Carter III (2008). The album sold 1,005,545 copies in its first week of sales in the United States, and produced three top ten singles in the US, including the number one-hit "Lollipop". The album became the highest selling of the year in the United States. In a September 2008 interview with Shaheem Reid of MTV Mixtape Monday, Lil Wayne revealed that he had begun work on his next official mixtape, Dedication 3 (2008) and also confirmed a sequel to Tha Carter III, titled Tha Carter IV. Initial recording sessions for the album began in early October 2008, but these were put on hold, as later that month Wayne claimed that he did not want the album to follow Tha Carter III immediately.

No more information emerged on the album until October 2009, when Cash Money Records CEO Birdman reported that Wayne would release three studio albums on December 15, 2009: Tha Carter IV, Rebirth, an album being promoted as Wayne's debut rock music album, and We Are Young Money, a collaborative recording with members of Wayne's record label, Young Money Entertainment. However, it was later confirmed that Rebirth and We Are Young Money would be released separately and that Tha Carter IV would be released in 2011. Tha Carter IV was going to be released in late May, but was pushed back to June. Mack Maine confirmed that the album's release was postponed because they still needed time to make it perfect. On June 2, 2011, the album was pushed back further, and the album was due for release on August 29, 2011.

The album's cover was released to the internet on April 19, 2011. A deluxe edition has been confirmed for Tha Carter IV, with the album's cover being released to the internet as well.

Also the track "Dear Anne (Stan Part 2)" (originally "Anne") was supposed to be on Tha Carter IV but was removed from the album. Lil Wayne said in an interview with XXL that he was not a fan of "Dear Anne" and that it had been planned to appear on Tha Carter III. On July 8, 2011, producer Swizz Beatz hinted at Wayne possibly re-recording a new version of Anne, after he had said the verses were too "old". Prior to Tha Carter IVs release, Swizz Beatz released the song on his Monster Mondays free music program through his official website.

On June 13, 2011, a track called "Nightmares of the Bottom" from Tha Carter IV was confirmed on MTV's Unplugged by Lil Wayne performing live. On July 11, 2011, Lil Wayne confirmed in an interview with MTV that Tha Carter IV is finished and will be releasing on August 29, 2011. On August 7–8, 2011 videos of Lil Wayne recording a song called "She Will" and featuring Drake was posted online and would be on the album. The song was released on the Internet on August 12, 2011. HipHollywood released a YouTube video about T-Pain giving a song to Lil Wayne for his album called, "How to Hate," confirming that it will be on the album.

Singles
The album's lead single, "6 Foot 7 Foot", which features Cory Gunz, was released on December 16, 2010. It peaked at nine on the US Billboard Hot 100 and at two on both the US Hot R&B/Hip-Hop Songs chart and US Rap Songs chart, in addition to reaching the top fifty in Canada. The video made premieres on MTV on March 3, 2011 and on BET's 106 & Park on March 4, 2011. The video (directed by Hype Williams) was inspired by the film Inception, and consists of numerous scenes which visualize many of the metaphors and similes Wayne says in the song.

"John", which features Rick Ross was released as the second single on March 24, 2011 and debuted at twenty-two on the US Hot 100. It also reached nineteen on US R&B charts and twelve on US Rap charts. The official music video was released on VEVO on May 12, 2011. The video also featured a cameo by Birdman and was directed by Colin Tilley, director of "Look at Me Now" by Chris Brown, and No Sleep by Wiz Khalifa.

"How to Love" was released as the third single on May 31, 2011. It had peaked at number five on the US Hot 100, becoming Wayne's fourteenth top ten hit and the best performing single from the album. It also peaked at number two on US R&B charts and number two on US Rap charts, in addition to reaching the top forty in Canada and top fifty in the UK. Detail, the song's producer, claimed Lil Wayne used no Auto-Tune in the song; The music video (directed by Chris Robinson) premiered August 23, 2011 on MTV Jams as "Jam of the Week".

The fourth single, "She Will", which features Drake, was released on the internet on August 12, 2011. The song was to be titled "Maybe She Will", and feature a verse from Rick Ross, however it did not make the final cut. The single released on download format in the United States on August 16, 2011.

The fifth single, "It's Good", which features Jadakiss and Drake, was solicited to urban radio as the album's fifth single on September 13, 2011.

The sixth single from the album is "Mirror" featuring Bruno Mars, which is a bonus track on the deluxe edition. It was released to urban radio on September 13, 2011. It was sent to Rhythmic radio and re-released to urban radio on November 1, 2011. Upon the release of Tha Carter IV it debuted at number sixteen on the US Hot 100 based on downloads alone.

 Critical reception 

Tha Carter IV received generally mixed reviews from critics, with many viewing it as a disappointment. At Metacritic, which assigns a weighted mean rating out of 100 to reviews from mainstream publications, the album received an average score of 60, based on 29 reviews. Robert Christgau wrote in The Barnes & Noble Review that the record "has its moments ... but its stunted sense of play is summed up by the T-Pain-aided 'How to Hate.'" Chicago Tribune writer Greg Kot viewed that Wayne "sounds slower, more methodical, less unhinged" and felt that he is held back by "repetitive subject matter — even Wayne sounds bored by trying to flip yet one more clever couplet about blunts and 'hos." Sean Fennessey of Spin wrote that "it's not a terribly ambitious mess, nor is it much fun, which for Wayne is a sin," and criticized his lyrics, stating "He rarely divulges specific moments ... usually keeping the gritty details unexplained." Slant Magazines Matthew Cole commented that the album's production "chases trends far more often than it attempts to set them" and found Wayne "not in exhilarating top form". Los Angeles Times writer Jeff Weiss viewed his lyrics as "predictable" and called the album "more pedestrian than embarrassing." Andy Hutchins of The Village Voice called it "a bad rap album" and criticized its music as "a composition of a lot of rapping styles Wayne's dabbled in and production styles that have been bubbling in rap for some time, except little of it clicks."

In a positive review, Rolling Stone writer Rob Sheffield stated, "it's thrilling how unhinged Weezy sounds", adding that "even the failed moments sound like nobody else". Allmusic editor David Jeffries stated, "If II and III were the arguable masterpieces, this one is less convincing, but it is a solid, above average hip-hop album". Jon Caramanica of The New York Times felt that the guest rappers bring "their A game" and stated, "even on this album's weak tracks, and there are several, [Wayne] remains a commanding presence, deploying just enough of his insistent croak to tether the song together."

 Commercial performance 
Tha Carter IV had 300,000 downloads in its first four days online, which broke an iTunes record set by Watch the Throne. In the United States, Tha Carter IV debuted at number one on the US Billboard 200 chart, selling 964,000 copies in its first week. It achieved the highest first-week album sales since Lady Gaga's Born This Way. In its second week, the album stayed at number one on the chart, despite a 77% decrease in sales, selling 219,000 copies. By February 2012, the album had sold 3.5 million copies worldwide. By July 2013, it had sold 2,296,000 copies in the US. On September 25, 2020, the album was certified five times platinum by the Recording Industry Association of America (RIAA) for combined sales and album-equivalent units of over of five million units in the United States.

In Canada, the album debuted at number one on the Canadian Albums Chart, selling 31,000 copies in its first week.

Track listing
Album credits adapted from official liner notes.Notes  signifies a co-producer.
  signifies an additional producer.Sample credits' "6 Foot 7 Foot" contains samples of "Day-O (The Banana Boat Song)" as written and performed by Harry Belafonte.
 "John" contains an interpolation "I'm Not a Star" as written by William Roberts II, Kevin Crowe and Erik Ortiz.
 "President Carter" contains a sample of "Les Dunes D'ostende" as written and performed by François de Roubaix, which is the theme song to the 1971's horror film Daughters of Darkness; and excerpts from a speech by Jimmy Carter.
 "It's Good" contains a sample of "The Cask of Amontillado" as written and performed by The Alan Parsons Project.
 "Novacane" contains elements of "Everything Must Change" as written and performed by Benard Ighner.

Personnel
Credits for Tha Carter IV'' adapted from Allmusic.

 Richard Adlam – choir, chorus, keyboards
 Christopher Allen – producer
 Angel Onhel Aponte – composer, producer
 Danny Arrondo – recording assistant
 Roland "DJ Folk" Bailey – production coordination
 Alton Bates – engineer
 Joshua Berkman – A&R
 Robert "Big Briz" Brisbane – engineer
 Sandy Brummels – creative director
 Cortez Bryant – executive producer
 Katina Bynum – project manager
 Michael "Banger" Cadahia – engineer
 Noel Cadastre – recording assistant
 Mrs. Carter – cover image
 The commission – producer
 Cool & Dre – producer
 Martika Cortes – recording assistant
 Seandrae "Mr. Bangladesh" Crawford – producer
 Detail – producer
 Alex Dilliplane – mixing assistant
 Diplo – producer
 DJA – producer
 Luis Duque – recording assistant
 DVLP – producer
 Dwayne Carter – composer, executive producer
 Eric Eylands – mixing assistant
 Filthy – producer
 Young Fyre – producer
 Elizabeth Gallardo – mixing assistant, recording assistant
 Brian "Big Bass" Gardner – mastering
 Guthrie Govan – bass, guitar
 Rob Holladay – producer

 Ghazi Hourani – mixing assistant
 Infamous – producer
 Chad Jolley – mixing assistant
 Ke'Noe – producer
 Kyledidthis – art direction, design
 Steve Lee – choir, chorus
 Edward "Jewfro" Lidow – assistant engineer, engineer, recording assistant
 Andrew Lloyd – additional production
 Mack Maine – executive producer
 Fabian Marascuillo – mixing
 MegaMan – producer
 Eddie "Krack Keys" Montilla – composer, piano, strings
 Nabil – photography
 Neal H. Pogue – mixing
 Polow da Don – producer
 REO – producer
 Harry Ritson – choir, chorus, keyboards
 Rudy Rodriguez – recording assistant
 Noah Shebib – engineer
 The Smeezingtons – producer
 Snizzy – producer
 Jeremy Stevenson – mixing
 Streetrunner – additional production
 T-Minus – producer
 Drum Up – producer
 Javier Valverde – engineer
 Seth Waldman – mixing assistant
 Willy Will – producer
 Bryan "Baby Birdman" Williams – executive producer
 Ronald "Slim Tha Don" Williams – executive producer
 Kevin Zulueta – engineer

Charts

Weekly charts

Year-end charts

Decade-end charts

Certifications

Release history

References

2011 albums
Lil Wayne albums
Cash Money Records albums
Young Money Entertainment albums
Universal Republic Records albums
Albums produced by Bangladesh (record producer)
Albums produced by Cool & Dre
Albums produced by Diplo
Albums produced by Emile Haynie
Albums produced by J.U.S.T.I.C.E. League
Albums produced by Detail (record producer)
Albums produced by Polow da Don
Albums produced by T-Minus (record producer)
Albums produced by the Smeezingtons
Albums produced by Timbaland
Sequel albums